Collao is a parish (administrative division) in Siero, a municipality within the province and autonomous community of Asturias, in northern Spain. The parish is located on Highway AS-113.

The population is 488 
(INE 2006). The postal code is 33518. 

Collao and other nearby parishes, such as Lieres and Carbayín, are historically associated with Andalusian mining.

Culture
Collao's patron saint festivities honor San Cristóbal, and are held every year on the first Sunday of July. 

The Gazetteer of SADEI identifies five notable sites within the parish: The Cirigüeyu, Cordón, Fuentemil, Llorián and La Quintana. 

Buildings unique to Collao include the Church of San Cristóbal de Collao, the old public school (now converted into a community center), and the Source of Veneros. Currently, there are two associations in Collao of social and cultural interest. The oldest of these is the Society of Celebration, which each year organizes the patron saint festival. The other is the Neighborhood Association, whose office is located in the school administration building.

References

External links
 Sociedad Asturiana de Estudios Económicos e Industriales (Asturian society of economic and industrial studies) (SADEI), English language

Parishes in Siero